ATV Offroad Fury 3 is a racing video game developed by Climax Racing and published by Sony Computer Entertainment for PlayStation 2.

The game was succeeded by ATV Offroad Fury 4 in 2006.

Gameplay
Expanding from its predecessor, ATV Offroad Fury 3 features more ATVs, along with more championships, mini-games and improved physics. As is with the rest of the series, the game revolves around racing all-terrain vehicles (ATVs) around dirt racetracks. In addition to racing, another major focus of the game is stunts. Stunts can be achieved by tapping a combination of buttons while the player's ATV is in the air. Each stunt requires a different amount of time to perform. The game also provides "free-roaming offroad gameplay".

The game also offers online play via i-Link, local area network (LAN) or other network connections.

The game contains features for customizability, such as choosing parts for your ATV, changing color schemes, and even creating your own unique logo.

Upon release in 2004, the game was well received by critics and fans of the franchise for its open world feel and advanced game physics.

PSP version 

A PlayStation Portable version was released a few months later titled ATV Offroad Fury: Blazin' Trails. The game revolves around racing all-terrain vehicles (ATVs) on a dirt track. Another major focus of the game is stunts. Stunts can be achieved by tapping a combination of buttons while the player's ATV is in the air. Each stunt requires a different amount of time to perform. In addition to racing, the game offers mini-games, training courses and a career mode.

The game also offers online play via a WiFi connection.

Development
ATV Offroad Fury 3 is the first game in the series not to be developed by Rainbow Studios after the company was acquired by THQ nearly a year prior to the release of Fury 2. As Rainbow Studios began working with THQ to develop MX Unleashed and start the MX vs. ATV series that serves as a crossover with THQ's MX trilogy, it approached Climax Studios, known for developing the ATV Quad Power Racing duology, to offer an opportunity to make another ATV racing game by continuing the Offroad Fury series.

Reception

ATV Offroad Fury 3 received "generally positive" and "mixed or average" reviews, according to review aggregator Metacritic.

References

External links
 

2004 video games
ATV Offroad Fury
Multiplayer and single-player video games
MX vs. ATV
PlayStation 2 games
Racing video games
Sony Interactive Entertainment games
Video games developed in the United Kingdom
SouthPeak Games